is the sixth solo studio album by Japanese hip hop producer DJ Krush. It was released in 2001. It peaked at number 66 on the Oricon Albums Chart.

Critical reception

John Bush of AllMusic gave the album 4 stars out of 5, saying, "DJ Krush works his way into a vision of sublime, downbeat hip-hop that's a snug fit with the title." Rashaun Hall of Billboard said, "Zen finds DJ Krush a true master of emotion".

At the 2002 AFIM Indie Awards, it won the award for Dance Album.

Track listing

Charts

References

Further reading

External links
 

2001 albums
DJ Krush albums